The Indiana University of Pennsylvania Crimson Hawks, commonly known as the IUP Crimson Hawks and formerly called the IUP Indians, are the varsity athletic teams that represent Indiana University of Pennsylvania, which is located in Indiana, Pennsylvania. The university and all of its intercollegiate sports teams compete in the Pennsylvania State Athletic Conference (PSAC) within the NCAA Division II. The university sponsors 19 different teams, including eight teams for men and eleven teams for women: baseball, men's and women's basketball, men's and women's cross country, women's field hockey, football, men's golf, women's lacrosse, women's soccer, softball, men's and women's swimming, women's tennis, men's and women's indoor and outdoor track and field, and women's volleyball.

Mascot

IUP originally dubbed its sports teams the "Indians", in reference to the town and school's name, and used a costumed student as a mascot. Following movements to eliminate Native American-related mascots, the university eliminated the Indian mascot in 1991, replacing it with an American black bear named Cherokee - deriving from the name of the university's fight song, though it retained the Indian nickname.

In the early 2000s, the university actively moved to change the nickname as well. A campus poll in 2002 indicated the students favored the "Fighting Squirrels" as a nickname. In May 2006, the NCAA ruled that IUP would be prohibited from hosting postseason championship games and using the Indian nickname in postseason events, a year after the university was placed on a list of 18 schools whose mascots were non-compliant with NCAA policies. Suggestions following the NCAA ruling included hellbenders, "Ridge runners", and mining-related nicknames, all relevant to the university's location in Western Pennsylvania.

In December 2006, the Council of Trustees adopted the "Crimson Hawk"  The mascot was introduced during the 2007 season-opening football game against Cheyney. In 2008, the hawk was named "Norm", in reference to the university's former name as the Indiana Normal School.

With the change of the mascot, it was for the best that IUP would change its fight song, "Cherokee", as well since it makes references to a Native American tribe. In 2007, Dr. David Martynuik, director of the marching band, composed "Crimson Xpress", the new fight song that would replace "Cherokee" and would bring in a whole new era to IUP athletics.

When a local sportswriter researched what a "Crimson Hawk" was, it was discovered that the domain name crimsonhawk.com was the site of an adult cartoon character named "Crimson Hawk". Some criticized the university's lack of research prior to making the decision. The site owner moved his content to a different domain name without the university asking or the issue being brought to court. Today, IUP remains the IUP Crimson Hawks in all of their sports and club competitions.

Facilities
University athletic facilities are roughly divided into two sections. On campus near the Eberly College of Business is Frank Cignetti Field at George P. Miller Stadium, a 6,500-seat artificial turf stadium that serves as the venue for football, field hockey, and track & field. Adjacent to Miller Stadium is the Memorial Field House, which used to be the host to men's and women's basketball, and women's volleyball, and additionally houses athletic department offices. Also inside the Field House is the Pidgeon Natatorium, which is used by the men's and women's swimming team. The South Campus Athletic Complex holds other sports venues: Owen Dougherty Field, home of the baseball team, Podbielski Field for the softball team, a soccer field and a rugby pitch.

Beginning in 1999, a construction project for a university convocation center was authorized by Pennsylvania Governor Tom Ridge. Construction began near Miller Stadium in late 2008 for the  complex that will hold a 6,000-seat arena. The Kovalchick Convention and Athletic Complex, which opened in the fall of 2011, is the current home of the men's and women's basketball teams and women's volleyball, replacing the Memorial Field House as these teams primary venues.

Men's sports

Football

The university's football program dates back to the 1890s when the team competed against regional athletic clubs and other universities. In the early years, the team featured John Brallier, who would become the first paid football player. Official records by the university begin with the tenure of George Miller in 1927. The Pennsylvania State Athletic Conference was formed in 1951 by the members of the Pennsylvania state university system, and the university has been a member since then, winning 17 West Division titles through 2010. In 1968 the team competed and lost to heavily favored Delaware in the Boardwalk Bowl. Under Frank Cignetti Sr., the Crimson Hawks regularly appeared in NCAA post-season competition, including two appearances in the NCAA Division II National Football Championship in 1990 and 1993. In 2012, under Curt Cignetti, the Crimson Hawks earned the PSAC title and another appearance in the NCAA Division II National Football Championship. They ultimately lost to the top seed in Super Region One, Winston-Salem State University. In 2017, under first-year head coach Paul Tortorella, the Crimson Hawks finished regular season with a perfect 11–0 record winning the PSAC Championship and earning an appearance in the NCAA Division II National Football Championship.

Golf
Conference championships: 1957, 1964, 1973, 1975, 1976, 1978, 1979, 1981, 1983, 1984, 1986, 1989, 1990, 1991, 1992, 1997, 1998, 2000, 2001, 2004 (spring), 2007, 2008, 2009, 2010, 2011, 2012, 2016, 2017, 2019, 2020, 2021, 2022
Team national championship:
1968 (NAIA)
Individual national champions:
1968 – Rick Hrip (NAIA)
2009 – Gavin Smith

Baseball
Conference championships: 1960, 1973, 1980, 1988, 1990.
NCAA Tournament appearances: 1988, 1990.
NAIA District 18 Champions: 1971, 1977.
NAIA District 30 Champions: 1960, 1964.
NAIA Area 8 Champions: 1960, 1971.
NAIA Baseball World Series appearances: 1960, 1971 (third place).

Men's basketball

Through 2010, the men's basketball team has made nine appearances in the NCAA tournament. In the first in 1994 the team advanced to the Elite Eight, after winning their regional competition. In total, the team has advanced to the Elite Eight five times, the Final Four three times, and their first national championship game in 2010, where they were defeated by the Cal Poly Pomona Broncos. In 2010, Joe Lombardi was named the Basketball Times Division II Coach of the Year, following the team's finish as national runner-up. In the 2017–18 season, the team went to the PSAC Quarter Finals. 

Conference championships: 1974, 1995, 2000, 2002, 2004, 2010, 2011, 2013.
NCAA playoff appearances: 1994 (Elite Eight), 1995 (Final Four), 1996, 2000 (Elite Eight), 2002 (Final Four), 2004, 2005, 2009, 2010 (National runner-up), 2011 (Atlantic Region final/Sweet Sixteen), 2012, 2013 (Atlantic Region final/Sweet Sixteen), 2015 (National runner-up), 2017

Women's sports

Women's basketball
The IUP Women's basketball team won the Atlantic Regional Championships Elite Eight Division II in March 2018. The team has also gone to the PSAC Semifinals and Division II Final Four Semifinals in 2018 and 2019. Their coach, Tom McConnell has led them to many victories over the past few years.

Conference championships: 1988, 2007, 2008, 2009, 2017
NCAA playoff appearances: 1988, 1998 (Elite Eight), 2000, 2007, 2008, 2009, 2012, 2013, 2015, 2016, 2017, 2018 Final Four and 2019 Final Four

Field hockey
Conference championships: 2007.
NCAA tournament appearances: 2000, 2004, 2005, 2006 (National semifinals), 2007 (National semifinals), 2008.

Soccer
Conference championships: 1995, 2004.
Division championships: 2005, 2006.
NCAA playoff appearances: 2004, 2006, 2009.

Softball
The women's softball team began play in 1979. Beginning in 2009, they compete in the Central Division of the PSAC. They have made appearances in the NCAA tournament in 1999, 2000, 2001, 2002, 2003, 2005, and 2010.

Volleyball
Conference championships: 2002.

Lacrosse
The women's lacrosse program began play in 1999, and achieved their first winning season in 2001 with an 8–7 record.

Tennis
In the 2010–2011 season, the women's tennis team defeated Slippery Rock placing 2nd in their division just behind California University of Pennsylvania. The team lost in the first round to Armstrong Atlantic 5–0. The women also had the most wins ever in a season (21–8).
 Conference championships: 2017
 NCAA playoff appearances: 2002, 2004, 2010, 2011, 2012, 2013, 2014, 2015, 2016, 2017
 NCAA Sweet 16 appearances: 2011, 2012, 2013, 2014, 2015, 2016, 2017

Co-ed sports

Cross country
Men's conference championships: 1972, 1977, 1978, 1982, 1983, 1996.
Women's conference championships: 1980, 1983, 1984, 1985, 1967, 1987, 1990.
Women's individual championships: 1986, 1987, 1991, 1991, 2001, 2002, 2003.

Swimming
Women's conference championships: 1999.

Track & field
The PSAC offers both indoor winter and outdoor spring track & field seasons. 
Women's conference championships: 1988
Individual national champions 
2011 – Nafee Harris, long jump (indoor)
2010 – Nafee Harris, long jump (outdoor)
2010 – Nafee Harris, long jump (indoor)
2009 – Nafee Harris, long jump (outdoor)
2008 – Sean Strauman, 800 metres
2002 – Mark Bridge, javelin
2001 – Amber Plowden, 100 meters
2001 – Derek Brinkley, 400 meter hurdles
1993 – Bob Vranich, javelin
1992 – Alan Pugh, discus
1990 – Bob Babiak, decathlon
1990 – Jeffrey Neral, javelin
1987 – Dave Maudie, javelin
1986 – Tammy Donnelly, 10,000 meters
1973 – John Elliot, javelin (NAIA)

Club sports
The university offers many club sports that compete intercollegiately but are not sponsored by the athletic department include:
 Sailing - Member of Middle Atlantic Intercollegiate Sailing Association
Ultimate Frisbee- Men's and Women's
Cycling – Eastern Collegiate Cycling Conference
Men's ice hockey – College Hockey Mid-America, ACHA Division I;  Tri-State Collegiate Hockey League, ACHA Division II.
The men's ice hockey team competes at the Division I level of the American Collegiate Hockey Association (ACHA) in the College Hockey Mid-America, ACHA Division and plays at the S&T Bank Arena.  In the 2018–19 season, won the CHMA season championship. In the 2019–20 season, the team won the CHMA playoffs and awarded a bid to the ACHA National Tournament as the 19th seed, but the tournament was canceled due to the COVID-19 pandemic.
Between 1998 and 2005, the top men's team (then at the Division II level) won the championship of the University Hockey League three times, and was runner-up four times.
Women's ice hockey – Delaware Valley Collegiate Hockey Conference, ACHA Division II
The women's ice hockey team won the DVCHC in 2005.
Men's lacrosse – Keystone Division, National College Lacrosse League
Men's volleyball – Penn-Ohio Volleyball League
The men's volleyball team won the POVL in 2009 and 2010.
Men's rugby
The men's rugby team 2022 D2 7s National Champions, 2022 15s National Finalists. Finished 4th in 2013. Finished 3rd in the Division I national championship in 2000, behind California-Berkeley and Wyoming Universities.  IUP finished ahead of fourth-place Army.
Women's rugby
Men's soccer
 Men's Club Baseball- Member of National Club Baseball Association

The IUP orienteering team won three intercollegiate national championships (1973, 1975, 1976).  In 1999, Samantha Zipp of IUP was the women's individual orienteering national champion.

Notable alumni

Notable alumni that have played for IUP teams include:
Raymond Bernabei, former soccer player and official, National Soccer Hall of Fame
John Brallier, the first paid professional football player
Frank Cignetti Jr., NFL and college football assistant coach
Frank Cignetti Sr., West Virginia and IUP football coach
Lawson Fiscus, early professional football players
Kris Griffin, former NFL player
Mel Hankinson, former college basketball coach
Jim Haslett, former NFL player and head coach
Jack Henry, former NFL assistant coach
Mike Jemison, former NFL and NFL Europe player
Leander Jordan, former NFL player
Bob Ligashesky, Pittsburgh Steelers assistant coach
LeRon McCoy, former NFL player
Dan Radakovich, Georgia Tech athletic director
Chris Villarrial, former NFL player
Ryan Uhl, former MLB player
Ethan Cooper, current NFL player
Christian Cochran, Actor and Writer

References